Rodrigue Mels ; (born April 15, 1985, in Les Abymes, Guadeloupe) is a French professional basketball player. He is 1.90 m (6'3") tall and plays at both the shooting guard and point guard positions. Throughout his career, he has played for French clubs SLUC Nancy, Châlons-Reims and BC Orchies, as well as AEK Athens in Greece.  He previously played college basketball at California State University, Northridge.

References

1985 births
Living people
AEK B.C. players
BC Orchies players
Cal State Northridge Matadors men's basketball players
French men's basketball players
Greek Basket League players
Place of birth missing (living people)
Reims Champagne Basket players
Guards (basketball)